Kwah is the usual English form of the name of the famous Carrier leader Kw'eh. He was born around 1755 and died in 1840. Chief Kw'eh was the chief of his keyoh called Nak'azdli in the late eighteenth and early nineteenth centuries,  now known as the Nak'azdli Band. In his time, few people lived at Nak'azdli (Fort Saint James), which attracted people due to the location of the North West Company (later Hudson's Bay Company) fort there, which was not established until 1806.

Chief Kwah was a significant Keyoh Chief and his land was situated along the Stuart River. The Keyoh system is the customary land governance structure (pre 1846) of the Stuart Lake Carrier peoples and has been in place for at least 500 years. Each Keyoh consists of an extended family and a Keyoh Chief (Holder) appointed per customs. Chief Kw'eh held the very important noble name Ts'oh Dai in the Lhts'umusyoo clan. The clans were introduced in 1800s to allow the people a structure for gatherings and funerals, it is a social aspect. Furthermore, each Keyoh Chief could decide to contribute any additional resources to a clan.  Chief Kw'eh received the explorer Simon Fraser in 1806 when Carrier people brought his foundering canoes into Tsaooche village, another family's keyoh in Sowchea Bay. In gratitude, Simon Fraser presented Kw'eh with red cloth.

Chief Kw'eh is also known for the incident in which, in 1828, he spared the life of his prisoner, the fur trader James Douglas, who later became the first governor of the united Colony of British Columbia. He was also known for his acquisition of an iron dagger prior to the arrival of the first Europeans in the area, presumably one traded in from the coast. He is the ancestor of a large percentage of the Carrier people in the Stuart Lake area.

References
Bishop, Charles A., "Kwah: A Carrier Chief," in  Old Trails and New Directions: Papers of the Third North American Fur Trade Conference,  C.M. Judd & A.J. Ray (eds.), Toronto, 1980, pp. 191–204.
Bishop, Charles A., "!Kwah (Quâs),"  in  Dictionary of Canadian Biography, 2000.
Klippenstein, Frieda Esau, "The Challenge of James Douglas and Carrier Chief Kwah," in Reading Beyond Words: Contexts for Native History, (2nd ed.), edited by Jennifer S.H. Brown and Elizabeth Vibert, pp. 163–192, Broadview Press, Peterborough, Ontario, 2003.
Klippenstein, Frieda Esau, "Myth-Making At Fort St. James: The Search for Historical ‘Truth'," in The Beaver, August–September, pp. 22–29, 1994.
Steward, Julian H., Anthropologist and Ethnographer, 1941a Investigations among Carrier Indians.
Morice, Adrien-Gabriel (1904) History of the Northern Interior of British Columbia. Toronto: William Briggs.
Rosetti, Bernadette (1979) Kw'eh Ts'u Haindene. Descendents of Kwah - a Carrier Indian genealogy. Fort Saint James: Carrier Linguistic Committee and Necoslie Indian Band.
Sam, Lillian (ed.), Nak'azdli t'enne Yahulduk - Nak'azdli Elders Speak, Penticton, B.C.: Theytus Press, 2001.

External links
biography with photo of grave
description of Keyoh system

1750s births
1840 deaths
18th-century indigenous people of the Americas
19th-century First Nations people
Dakelh people
Indigenous leaders in British Columbia
Pre-Confederation British Columbia people
Persons of National Historic Significance (Canada)